Adbelahide, Adele, Adela or Adelaide of Aquitaine (also known as Adelaide of Poitiers; c. 945 or 952 – 1004), was Queen of France by marriage to Hugh Capet, King of the Franks (c. 939 – 14 October 996). Adelaide and Hugh were the founders of the Capetian dynasty of France, which would rule France until the 18th and 19th centuries. As queen consort, Adelaide had some extent of influence over her husband's governance of France. Adelaide is typically only briefly mentioned in connection to her husband, Hugh, and her son Robert II.

Life
Adelaide was the daughter of William III, Duke of Aquitaine and Adele of Normandy, daughter of Rollo of Normandy.

On May 29, 987, after the death of Louis V, the last Carolingian king of France, Hugh was elected the new king by an assembly of Frankish magnates at Senlis with Adelaide as queen. The couple were proclaimed as the new monarchs at Senlis and blessed at Noyon on June 1, 987. As such, they had become the founders of the Capetian dynasty of France. Apparently, Hugh trusted in Adelaide's judgement and allowed her to take part in government. Hugh's recognition of Adelaide as “socia et particeps nostril regni,” roughly translated to “associate and participator in our realm,” demonstrates his apparent acclaim for Adelaide.

Adelaide's son Robert's tutor Gerbert of Aurillac came into conflict in the late 990's with Arnulf, the Archbishop of Reims. Gerbert took refuge with Otto III, Theophanu's son and the new Holy Roman Emperor, and Adelaide attempted to recall the former to Reims, but Gerbert reluctantly resisted this command in a letter dated to the spring of 997, citing concerns for his personal safety and the stability of the French kingdom had he returned to challenge Arnulf for the archbishopric.

Children 
Adelaide and Hugh had at least three children that lived to adulthood:

 Hedwig, Countess of Mons (or Hadevide, or Avoise) (c. 969–after 1013), wife of Reginar IV, Count of Mons
 Robert II (972–1031), the future king of France. Crowned co-king in 987, in order to consolidate the new dynasty.
 Gisèle, Countess of Ponthieu (c. 970–1002), wife of Hugh I, Count of Ponthieu.

Notes

References

Sources

10th-century births
1004 deaths
French queens consort
Countesses of Paris
House of Poitiers
10th-century French people
10th-century French women
11th-century French people
11th-century French women
Queen mothers